Yakov Fedotovich Pavlov (17 October 191728 September 1981) was a Soviet Red Army soldier who became a Hero of the Soviet Union for his role in defending the eponymous "Pavlov's House" during the Battle of Stalingrad.

Biography

Born in 1917 to a peasant family in the small village of Krestovaya in northwestern Russia (present-day Novgorod Oblast), Pavlov joined the Red Army in 1938. During World War II, he fought on the Southwestern, Stalingrad, 3rd Ukrainian and 2nd Belorussian fronts. Pavlov was a commander of a machine gun unit, an artilleryman, and a commander of a reconnaissance unit with the rank of senior sergeant.

During the Battle of Stalingrad, on the night of September 27, 1942, Pavlov's platoon recaptured a four-story residential building from the German Army, and defended it against continual attack by the Germans until relieved by advancing Soviet forces two months later. Vasily Chuikov, commanding general of the Soviet forces in Stalingrad, later joked that the Germans lost more men trying to take Pavlov's House than they did taking Paris.

The building and its defense went down in history as "Pavlov's House" (Дом Павлова). For his actions in Stalingrad, he was awarded the Hero of the Soviet Union, the Order of Lenin, the Order of the October Revolution, two Orders of the Red Star and numerous other medals.

Post-war, he joined the Communist Party.  He was elected three times as Deputy to the Supreme Soviet of the Russian Soviet Federative Socialist Republic.

Pavlov died on 28 September 1981, and was buried in Novgorod.

In popular culture
Pavlov appeared in a level in the 2003 first-person shooter game Call of Duty. The player, playing as Junior Sergeant Alexei Ivanovich Voronin assists Sergeant Pavlov and his unit in capturing an apartment complex and defending it against a German counterattack until Soviet reinforcements arrive.

Pavlov appeared in a level in the strategic game Panzer-Corps 2 DLC Axis Operations 1942.
 
Pavlov VR, a virtual reality first person shooter game, is named after Yakov Pavlov's defense of the building that came to be known as Pavlov's House.

References

1917 births
1981 deaths
People from Novgorod Oblast
Battle of Stalingrad
Communist Party of the Soviet Union members
Heroes of the Soviet Union
Recipients of the Order of Lenin
Russian people of World War II
Soviet military personnel of World War II
Soviet politicians